Strejcekia elegans is a species of parasitoid wasps in the subfamily Pteromalinae. It is found in Europe.

References

External links 

 Strejcekia elegans at fauna-eu.org

Pteromalidae
Insects described in 1972